Regina City Council is the governing body of Regina, the capital city of the central Canadian province of Saskatchewan. The council, which meets in Henry Baker Hall at Queen Elizabeth II Court, consists of the mayor, who is elected city-wide, and ten councillors representing ten wards throughout the city. The current council was elected to a four-year term on November 9, 2020.

Council

See also
 2020 Saskatchewan municipal elections

References

External links
 Regina City Council
 Ward boundaries
 Elections Regina

Municipal councils in Saskatchewan
Politics of Regina, Saskatchewan